AdventHealth Ocala, formerly named Florida Hospital Ocala and Munroe Regional Medical Center, is an acute care non-profit hospital in Ocala, Florida. AdventHealth Ocala is located at 1500 SW 1st Ave, Ocala, Florida.

The healthcare facility is owned by the Marion County Hospital District, and has been leased to AdventHealth since 2018.  The hospital district is largely funded by the US$213 million paid to the district by Community Health Systems in 2014 for the right to operate this facility.  CHS sold their lease to AdventHealth in 2018.

History 
The hospital was founded in 1898 as Marion General Hospital. The impetus for building a local hospital was a man being run over by a horse and wagon.  The initial location was a three-story building owned by the publisher of the local newspaper, the Star–Banner, which was lent to the new hospital until 1901.

The hospital operated in makeshift housing until 1915 when additional land was acquired for the hospital to expand. A three-story hospital building was constructed and was able to treat up to 50 patients in an emergency. In 1927, local residents approved a bond issue to build expanded four-story building that could handle 73 patients.  It was built on the same site and is still in use today as the northernmost building of the hospital. In 1928, the hospital was renamed to Munroe Memorial Hospital in honor of community leader T.T. Munroe, a local banker, who gathered community support and led the push to expand the hospital. The hospital has undergone extensive expansion over the years. By the early 1960s, the hospital had grown to 130 beds. In 1980, the hospital was again renamed to Munroe Regional Medical Center. The hospital expanded to 323 beds in 1994 and 421 beds in 2003.

On August 1, 2018, the hospital was renamed Florida Hospital Ocala. The hospital was renamed to AdventHealth Ocala in January 2019 when Adventist Health System rebranded to AdventHealth.

In February 2022, AdventHealth Ocala received a donation of $1.7 million to create a maternal fetal medicine program, the program will start in the fall of 2022.

See also
List of AdventHealth hospitals

References

External links 
 AdventHealth Ocala
 AdventHealth Unveils Ambulance Fleet in Marion County Orlando Medical News

Hospital buildings completed in 1898
Hospitals in Florida
Buildings and structures in Ocala, Florida
1898 establishments in Florida
Community Health Systems
AdventHealth